Maléon is a hamlet in the outskirts of le Moulinon (a suburb of Saint-Sauveur-de-Montagut) in the Ardèche département of France. The hamlet is affiliated to Saint-Sauveur-de-Montagut.

The Auzène river flows up through the hamlet, and as a result it is possible to swim in the river underneath the bridge. There are a few families living in Maléon, although there are cottages often frequented by tourists in the summer months.

Villages in Auvergne-Rhône-Alpes